Ricardo is a small census-designated place in Kleberg County, Texas, United States. As of the 2010 census it had a population of 1,048.

Located on U.S. Highway 77 between Kingsville and Riviera, it consists of a farmers co-op, a convenience store, and an elementary/junior high school. The school's mascot is a Yellow Jacket. Since there is no high school, students either attend Kaufer High School in Riviera, Academy High School in Kingsville, or Henrietta M. King High School in Kingsville.

See also
Kingsville micropolitan area

References 

Census-designated places in Kleberg County, Texas
Census-designated places in Texas
Kingsville, Texas micropolitan area